Rade Glišović (born 9 February 1995) is a Serbian footballer who plays as a defender for Sloboda Užice.

Club career
Born in Užice, Glišović started his career with local club Jedinstvo Užice. He made his senior debut for the club in the 33rd fixture match of the 2012–13 season against Voždovac, and later made 20 more appearances for next two Serbian First League seasons and also played Serbian Cup match against Rad. At the beginning of 2015–16 season, Glišović played cup matches against Zemun and Čajetina, and later also spent the whole season as a standard defender. After he terminated the contract with club, Glišović joined Rudar Pljevlja in summer 2016, where noted one appearance in Montenegrin Cup, against Bokelj. At the beginning of 2017, Glišović returned to his home town and joined Sloboda Užice.

Career statistics

References

External links
 

1995 births
Living people
Sportspeople from Užice
Association football defenders
Serbian footballers
FK Jedinstvo Užice players
FK Rudar Pljevlja players
FK Sloboda Užice players
Serbian First League players